Football is the most popular sport in Austria. The Austrian Football Association, the ÖFB (Österreichischer Fußball-Bund), was founded in 1904 and has been a member of FIFA since then.
Despite the sport's popularity, except for a successful streak in the early 1930s, the country's national team has not been successful in tournaments. Austria played their first ever European championship as a qualifier in 2016, but finished last in their group and failed to advance. Their only prior appearance in the European championship was in 2008 (when it co-hosted the championship with Switzerland and was thus exempt from qualification), but was promptly eliminated already at the group stage.

In the World Cup, Austria has a slightly better record, achieving fourth and third place in 1934 and 1954, respectively. Other than that, Austria either did not enter (1930), did not qualify (1966, 1970, 1974, 1986, 1994, 2002, 2006, 2010, 2014, 2018, 2022), withdrew (1938, 1950, 1962), or was either eliminated at the group stages (1958,  1990, 1998), or the second rounds (1978, 1982). 

In 1978 Austria won its group ahead of Brazil. In the group of the second round, any chance of progressing was gone after losses in the two first matches. But in the last match, against West Germany, which had chances of progressing even to the final, the Austrians produced what would become known as The Miracle of Córdoba, winning against any German national team (West, East or unified) for the first time in 47 years, thus eliminating the West German team from the tournament.

History
Football was born in Austria around 1890, and from 1900 a cup was played in Vienna called Neues Wiener Tagblatt Pokal. The first football league of the country was born in 1911, called 1. Klasse, organized by the Football Federation of Lower Austria, and became a professional league in 1924, the year in which it changed its name to I. Liga. In 1929 an amateur championship was organized that Grazer AK won, in which the clubs of the professional league of Vienna were excluded from participating.

The national team became a European power in the 1930s under the command of coach Hugo Meisl and the leadership of Matthias Sindelar, which earned him the nickname "Wunderteam". On May 16, 1931 the Austrian national team was the first European to defeat Scotland, and subsequently won the Central European International Cup in 1932, finished in fourth place in the 1934 World Cup and won the silver medal in the Olympic Games of Berlin 1936.

In 1937 the Nationalliga was introduced, the second division in which the equipment of other states of Austria could ascend and consist of the maximum competition of the country. With the annexation of Austria by Nazi Germany came the prohibition of professionalism in sport in May 1938 and several teams were banned, such as Hakoah Vienna and FK Austria Wien.  The Nationalliga joined the system of the Nationalsozialistischer Reichsbund für Leibesübungen (National Socialist League of the Reich). The Gauliga Ostmark, an amateur league, covered most of the country except the Tyrol and Vorarlberg, which were included in the Bavarian league system. The league champion qualified for the German championship, and after the Second World War returned the 1. Klasse - later called only Liga -, only for Viennese teams.

After the creation of Staatsliga A in 1949, all Austrian teams came together to form a league. However, the road to organizing the league was difficult. A conflict between the representatives of amateur and professional football led to the separation of the Vienna league from the football federation, and a new competition was established on June 30, 1949. A year later the Staatsliga B, the second division, was born. which remained until 1959.

On April 21, 1974 the current Bundesliga was introduced, and the Nationalliga was established as the second division of the country (now known as the First League of Austrian Football First League). The Austrian Football Federation (ÖFB) is the highest professional football organization in Austria and was founded in 1904, although it joined FIFA in 1905 and UEFA in 1954. The ÖFB organizes the Bundesliga - the first and highest league competition of the country- and the Austrian Cup, and manages the national men's and women's national team.

The oldest team in Austria is First Vienna FC, champion of the German Cup in 1943 and six Austrian leagues. SK Rapid Wien is the most successful team in the country, with 32 league titles, one German championship and two runners-up in the European Cup Winners Cup. FK Austria Wien also managed to be a finalist of the European Cup Winners' Cup in 1978 and FC Red Bull Salzburg were finalist of the UEFA Cup in 1993–94.

National team
The Austrian men's national team, in its different categories, is controlled by the Austrian Football Federation.

The Austrian team played their first official game on October 12, 1902 in Vienna against Hungary, a match that was resolved with victory by the Austrians 5-0. This match was the first played between two non-British European teams.

Austria has managed to qualify for seven FIFA World Cups and one European Championship, which was organized together with Switzerland in 2008. The Austrian combined team's third-best achievement was the third place in the 1954 World Cup, the fourth in the Cup. World Cup of 1934 and the silver medal won at the 1936 Olympic Games in Berlin. In the 1930s, the Austrian team known as "Wunderteam" had players like Matthias Sindelar, nicknamed the "Mozart of football", 8 the scorer Josef Bican and Johann Horvath. This team was 14 undefeated games, 9 from April 12, 1931 to December 7, 1932, in that same period they won the Central European International Cup. Between the years of 1931 to 1934, they had the impressive run of 28 victories, a draw and two defeats, scoring a whopping 102 goals, reaching the World Cup in 1934.

Andreas Herzog, with 104 internationals, is the player who has worn the shirt of the national team most times. The top scorer in history is Toni Polster, with 44 goals in 95 games.

Competitions

League system
The Bundesliga is the highest national league-club competition in Austria. It has twelve teams, the second tier is the Second Division (2. Liga) and has 16 teams. The third tier consists of three parallel divisions which are the regional leagues (Regionalliga). These cover the different regions of Austria as follows: the East (Regionalliga Ost), which comprises teams from Vienna, Lower Austria, and Burgenland; the Central (Regionalliga Mitte), featuring teams from Styria, Carinthia, Upper Austria, and East Tyrol; and the West (Regionalliga West), competed for by teams from Salzburg, Tyrol, and Vorarlberg. The fourth tier is the state league (Landesliga), with the 2. Landesliga as the fifth tier in Lower Austria and Vienna. Most states have 7 to 10 official tiers, but in Vienna unofficial tiers exist under the normal tiers. They are not organized by the ÖFB, but theoretically the champions of these tiers can promote to the official ÖFB-tiers.

Below shows how the current system works.

Austrian Cup

Women's football

Domestic football
Until 1982 the championship was organized by Wiener Fußball-Verband. After that date he went to the organization of the National Federation. The championship has a national character for the first two divisions, ÖFB-Frauenliga and 2. Frauenliga, which in turn is divided into three groups: Mitte / West (composed of 10 teams), Ost (11) and Süd (7). The first of each group runs the promotions for the promotion, retires the last ranked. Regional tournaments are organized, organized by the individual Federation of Land, from 3rd to 5th level.

Until 2004, the winner contested the Austrian Supercup against the winners of the Austrian Cup.

In the 2010-2011 season, 334 teams are registered

National team

The Austrian women's national team debuted on July 9, 1970 before the selection of Mexico in a match won by the Mexicans by 9-0 in Italy. The Austrian women's team has not yet participated in a  the FIFA Women's World Cup but reached the semi-finals of  the European Championship in 2017.

Largest football stadiums in Austria

See also
 Austria national football team
 Austrian Bundesliga

References

External links
 League321.com - Austrian football league tables, records & statistics database.
 Austrian football league summary(flashscore)